Nuno Borges and Francisco Cabral were the defending champions but chose not to defend their title.

Vít Kopřiva and Jaroslav Pospíšil won the title after defeating Jeevan Nedunchezhiyan and Christopher Rungkat 3–6, 6–3, [10–4] in the final.

Seeds

Draw

References

External links
 Main draw

Braga Open - Doubles